The Social Solidarity party (Al-Takaful) is an Egyptian Islamist party with a membership of around 970 members. Five candidates affiliated with this party ran in the 2000 legislative elections.

External links
 at sis.gov.eg

1995 establishments in Egypt
Islamic political parties in Egypt
Political parties established in 1995
Political parties in Egypt